Song Seok-chan (born 18 May 1965) is a South Korean field hockey player. He competed in the men's tournament at the 1988 Summer Olympics.

References

External links

1965 births
Living people
South Korean male field hockey players
Olympic field hockey players of South Korea
Field hockey players at the 1988 Summer Olympics
Place of birth missing (living people)
Asian Games medalists in field hockey
Asian Games gold medalists for South Korea
Medalists at the 1986 Asian Games
Field hockey players at the 1986 Asian Games